The 1977 NSL Cup Final was the first NSL Cup Final, the final match of the 1977 NSL Cup. It was played at Perry Park in Brisbane, Australia, on 9 October 1977, contested by Brisbane City and Marconi-Fairfield.

Route to the final

Brisbane City

Marconi-Fairfield

Match

Details

{| width="100%"
|valign="top" width="40%"|

References

NSL Cup Finals
October 1977 sports events in Australia
NSL Cup Final 1977
Soccer in Brisbane

Brisbane City FC
Marconi Stallions FC matches